Damel was the title of the ruler (or king) of the Wolof kingdom of Cayor in what is now northwest Senegal, West Africa.

The most well-known damel is probably Lat Dior Diop (1842–1886) who died in battle during the final French drive to capture his territory, which was one of the strongest areas of resistance. Lat Dior is a Senegalese national hero.

The 30th and last Damel of Cayor, Samba Laobé Fall, was killed by the leader of a French delegation, Captain Spitzer, at Tivaouane, Senegal.

Description 
Among the social classes found among the Wolof of Cayor, the Damel stood on the top of the hierarchy. The Damel were traditionally seen as great magicians and it was through female relatives that royal blood was transmitted.

List of damel
The following are the damel of Cayor, in order

1697–1719,                Lat Sukabe
1719–1748,                Isa-Tende
1748–1749,                Maissa Bigué Ngoné Fall (1st term)
1749–1757,                Ma-Bathio Samb
1757–1758,                Birima Kodu
1758–1759,                Maissa Bigué Ngoné Fall (2nd term)

1759–1760,                Birima Yamb
1760–1763,                Isa Bige Nagone
1763–1766,                Jor Yasin Isa
1766–1777,                Kodu Kumba
1777–1790,                Birima Fatim-Penda
1790–1809,                Amari Ngone Ndèla Kumba Fal
1809–1832,                Biram Fatma Cub Fal
1832–1855,                Maysa Tènde Jor Samba Fal
1855–1860,                Birima Ngone Latir Fal             (d. 1860)
1860–1861,                Ma-Kodu Kumba Yande Fal 
1861 May – 1861 Dec 8,     Ma-Jojo Jegeñ Kodu Fal (1st term)
1862 – 1864 Jan,            Lat Jor Ngone Latir Jop (1st term) (b. c.1842, d. 1886)
1864 Jan – 1868,            Ma-Jojo Jegeñ Kodu Fal (2nd term)
1871 Feb 12 – 1882,         Lat Jor Ngone Latir Jop (2nd term) (s.a.)
1883 Jan – 1883 Aug 28,     Amari Ngone Fal
1883 Aug 28 – 1886 Oct 6,   Samba Laobe Fal         
1979 oct 24  Papis Fall
1982 dec 31  Ami Dieng
 2007 jun 25 Daro Fall           (d. 1886)

See also
 Teign
 Maad a Sinig
 Maad Saloum
 Lingeer
 Buumi

Notes

References
Crowder, Michael (1968). West Africa Under Colonial Rule. Northwestern University Press.
Hale, Thomas A., Johnson, John William and Belcher, Stephen Paterson (1997). Oral Epics From Africa: Vibrant Voices From A Vast Continent. Indiana University Press. 
Harney, Elizabeth, (2004). In Senghor's Shadow: Art, Politics, and the Avant-garde in Senegal, 1960-1995. Duke University Press.

External links
Lat Dior, Le Kayor, l'impossible defi 

African royalty
Noble titles